Surrender is the fourth and final Capitol Records studio album by R&B singer O'Bryan. O'Bryan would not record another album until the 2007 release of "F1RST" under his own imprint, Headstorm.

Reception

Because of a lengthy negotiation with Capitol, "Surrender" was not released until more than two years after the release of O'Bryan's highest charting album, "Be My Lover." The single choices were the up-tempo "Tenderoni" and "Driving Force," but arguably the strongest cuts on the album were three ballads — "You Have Got To Come To Me," "Maria" and "Is This For Real" — that displayed O’Bryan’s musical and vocal development.

Track listing

Charts

Singles

Personnel
O'Bryan  – lead vocals, background vocals, synthesizer bass, drums, keyboards
Jerry Knight and Aaron Zigman – all instruments on "Tenderoni," "You Have Got To Come To Me" and "What Goes Around"
Melvin Davis – bass guitar
Karl Denson – saxophone
Virgie Hunter – trumpet
Paul Jackson, Jr. – guitar, acoustic guitar
Michael Norfleet – synthesizer horns, backgrounds
Chuck Morris – drums
Levi Seacer – guitar
Bruce Sterling – keyboards
David Vansuch – saxophone
Alex Brown – background vocals
Carmen Carter – background vocals
Lynn Davis – background vocals
Clayton Dover – background vocals
Rafael Dover – background vocals

References

External links
 O'Bryan - Surrender at Discogs

1986 albums
O'Bryan albums
Capitol Records albums
Boogie albums